The 1992 Canoe Slalom World Cup was a series of five races in 4 canoeing and kayaking categories organized by the International Canoe Federation (ICF). It was the 5th edition. The series consisted of 4 regular world cup races and the world cup final.

Calendar

Final standings 

The winner of each world cup race was awarded 25 points. The points scale reached down to 1 point for 15th place. Only the best three results of each athlete counted for the final world cup standings. If two or more athletes or boats were equal on points, the ranking was determined by their positions in the world cup final.

Results

World Cup Race 1 

The first world cup race of the season took place in Murupara, New Zealand from 15 to 16 February.

World Cup Race 2 

The second world cup race of the season took place in Launceston, Tasmania from 22 to 23 February.

World Cup Race 3 

The third world cup race of the season took place at the Holme Pierrepont National Watersports Centre in Nottingham from 30 to 31 May.

World Cup Race 4 

The fourth world cup race of the season took place in Merano, Italy from 6 to 7 June.

World Cup Final 

The final world cup race of the season took place in Bourg St.-Maurice, France from 19 to 20 June.

References

External links 
 International Canoe Federation

Canoe Slalom World Cup
1992 in canoeing